Wamanripa (Quechua wamanripa Senecio, "the one with the wamanripa", also spelled Huamanripa) is a mountain in the Andes of Peru which reaches an altitude of approximately . It is located in the Lima Region, Huarochirí Province, Carampoma District. Wamanripa lies southeast of Wamanripayuq.

References

Mountains of Peru
Mountains of Lima Region